Northanger Abbey is a coming-of-age novel and a satire of Gothic novels written by Jane Austen. Austen was also influenced by Charlotte Lennox's The Female Quixote (1752). Northanger Abbey was completed in 1803, the first of Austen's novels completed in full, but was published posthumously in 1817 with Persuasion. The story concerns Catherine Morland, the naïve young protagonist, and her journey to a better understanding of herself and of the world around her. How Catherine views the world has been distorted by her fondness for Gothic novels and an active imagination.

Plot summary
Seventeen-year-old Catherine Morland is one of ten children of a country clergyman. Although a tomboy in her childhood, by the age of 17 she is "in training for a heroine" and is fond of reading Gothic novels, "provided they were all story and no reflection".

Catherine is invited by the Allens (her wealthier neighbours in Fullerton) to accompany them to visit the city of Bath and partake in the winter season of balls, theatre and other social activities. Soon she is introduced to a young gentleman, Henry Tilney, with whom she dances and converses. Mrs. Allen meets an old school friend, Mrs. Thorpe, whose daughter Isabella introduces Catherine to Ann Radcliffe's Gothic novel Mysteries of Udolpho; the two quickly become friends. Mrs. Thorpe's son, John, is a friend of Catherine's older brother, James, at Oxford where they are both students and the two young men come to Bath where John is introduced to Catherine.

The Thorpes are not happy about Catherine's friendship with the Tilneys, as they correctly perceive Henry as a rival for Catherine's affections, though Catherine is not at all interested in John Thorpe. Despite John Thorpe continually attempting to sabotage her relationship with the Tilneys, Catherine tries to maintain her friendships with both the Thorpes and the Tilneys. This leads to several misunderstandings, which put Catherine in the awkward position of having to explain herself to the Tilneys.

Isabella and James become engaged. James' father approves of the match and offers his son a country parson's living of a modest sum, £400 annually, but they must wait until he can obtain the benefice in two and a half years. Isabella is dissatisfied, but to Catherine, she misrepresents her distress as being caused solely by the delay, and not by the value of the sum. Isabella immediately begins to flirt with Captain Tilney, Henry's older brother. Innocent Catherine cannot understand her friend's behaviour, but Henry understands all too well, as he knows his brother's character and habits.

The Tilneys invite Catherine to stay with them for a few weeks at their home, Northanger Abbey. Catherine, in accordance with her novel reading, expects the abbey to be exotic and frightening. Henry teases her about this, as it turns out that Northanger Abbey is pleasant and decidedly not Gothic. However, the house includes a mysterious suite of rooms that no one ever enters; Catherine learns that they were the apartments of Mrs. Tilney, who died nine years earlier. As General Tilney no longer appears to be ill-affected by her death, Catherine decides that he may have murdered her or even imprisoned her in her chamber.

Catherine discovers that her over-active imagination has led her astray, as nothing is strange or distressing in the apartments. Unfortunately, Henry questions her; he surmises, and informs her that his father loved his wife in his own way and was truly upset by her death. She leaves, crying, fearing that she has lost Henry's regard entirely. Realising how foolish she has been, Catherine comes to believe that, though novels may be delightful, their content does not relate to everyday life. Henry does not mention this incident to her again.

James writes to inform her that he has broken off his engagement to Isabella and that she has become engaged instead to Captain Tilney. Henry and Eleanor Tilney are sceptical that their brother has actually become engaged to Isabella Thorpe. Catherine is terribly disappointed, realising what a dishonest person Isabella is. A subsequent letter from Isabella herself confirms the Tilney siblings' doubts, and shows that Frederick Tilney was merely flirting with Isabella. The General goes off to London, and the atmosphere at Northanger Abbey immediately becomes lighter and pleasanter for his absence. Catherine passes several enjoyable days with Henry and Eleanor until, in Henry's absence, the General returns abruptly, in a temper. He forces Catherine to go home early the next morning, in a shocking, inhospitable, and unsafe move that forces Catherine to undertake the  journey alone.

At home, Catherine is listless and unhappy. Henry pays a sudden unexpected visit and explains what happened. General Tilney (on the misinformation of John Thorpe) had believed her to be exceedingly rich as the Allens' prospective heiress, and therefore a proper match for Henry. In London, General Tilney ran into Thorpe again, who, angry and petty at Catherine's refusal of his half-made proposal of marriage, said instead that she was nearly destitute. Enraged, General Tilney, (again on the misinformation of John Thorpe), returned home to evict Catherine. When Henry returned to Northanger, his father informed him of what had occurred and forbade him to think of Catherine again. When Henry learns how she had been treated, he breaks with his father and tells Catherine he still wants to marry her despite his father's disapproval. Catherine is delighted, though when Henry seeks her parents' approval, they tell the young couple that final approval will only happen when General Tilney consents.

Eventually, General Tilney acquiesces, because Eleanor has become engaged to a wealthy and titled man; and he discovers that the Morlands, while not extremely rich, are far from destitute.

Characters

Catherine Morland: The naive 17-year-old protagonist of the novel, Catherine lacks life experience, but is determined to see the best in people. Her appearance is "pleasing, and when in good looks, pretty." Her fondness for Gothic novels and an active imagination can skew her interpretation of real events. She has a sweet and good-natured personality and is observant but naïve, not seeing malicious underlying intentions in people's actions until the end of the novel. She shares with Henry Tilney her love of sarcastic humour. The novel follows Catherine as she grows and matures into a better understanding of people's natures after being exposed to the outside world in Bath.

James Morland: Catherine's older brother studying at Oxford University makes a surprise visit to Bath to see his sister and parents. He is humble, sweet, and fun-loving like his sister but he is not a very good judge of character, and he is both naïve and innocent when it comes to matters of the heart.

Henry Tilney: A quirky 26-year-old well-read clergyman, brother of Eleanor and Frederick Tilney, and a member of the wealthy Tilney family. He is Catherine's love interest and comes to return her feelings in the course of the novel and marries her in the end. He is sarcastic, intuitive, fairly handsome, and clever in nature.  He differs from Catherine in being attuned to the behaviour and underlying intentions of others and finds amusement in the folly of those around him.

John Thorpe: Brother of Isabella Thorpe, John is an arrogant and boastful young man. A terrible conversationalist as he talks of nothing but of his horses and carriages; he is loud, dimwitted, overbearing, vengeful, and rude, even to his own mother. John initially takes interest in Catherine and grows increasingly possessive of her, but when he discovers that it is Henry Tilney whom she loves, he finds ways to manipulate the situation to suit his liking.

Isabella Thorpe: Sister of John Thorpe, Isabella is a beautiful and charming 21-year-old woman who can be conniving and manipulative when it suits her purpose. She visits Bath in search of a wealthy husband. She befriends Catherine at Bath and when she learns about her family fortune, takes an interest in Catherine's brother, James Morland and eventually succeeds in getting a marriage offer which she accepts, but she later breaks off this engagement when she discovers that James will only receive a small portion of his inheritance and is forced to wait two years before marrying.

General Tilney: A stern and retired general, he is the despotic father of his three children: Captain Tilney (Frederick), Henry, and Eleanor. Rigid, overbearing, tyrannical, and materialistic in nature, General Tilney spends most of his time taking care of his estate at Northanger Abbey. Strict on punctuality and determined to "keep a tight ship", within his household, General Tilney is by nature inflexible, and has absolute distaste for anyone or anything that disrupts his schedule or breaks his sense of order. Some may speculate as to whether or not his difficult personality is due to his losing his wife years earlier (the wife died when Eleanor was a child), and being burdened with raising his children alone; however, what is certain, is that he is rude not only towards his children, but also in his poor treatment of Catherine. Throughout the novel, General Tilney keeps his focus on the advancement and social acceptance of his family, making this his top priority, even in terms of marriage. Essentially, General Tilney is so concerned with his family's name and fortune, that he tries to control who his children can and cannot marry, especially with regard to Henry's love for Catherine. Due to the misguided rumours from John Thorpe, General Tilney's perception of Catherine changes in that he once held her in high esteem, thinking that she came from a wealthy family; however, when a spurned John Thorpe later tells General Tilney that Catherine's family is essentially destitute, he denies Henry's marriage proposal to Catherine. Eventually, after his daughter's marriage to a nobleman, General Tilney's anger subsides, and when he discovers the truth in that Catherine does in fact descend from a modestly well-off family, he finally consents to Henry and Catherine's marriage. Upon further analysis, General Tilney's behaviour and attitude brings our attention to the social concerns that were common during Jane Austen's time period.

Eleanor Tilney: She is the younger sister of Frederick and Henry Tilney, and the daughter of the tyrannical General Tilney. Making her visit to the city of Bath at a later time, her friendship with Catherine Morland begins midway through the novel; however, despite this delay, she is sweet, kind, and humble like her brother Henry, and proves herself to be a much more loyal friend to Catherine, than Isabella ever was. Unfortunately, her role in Bath is not as significant as she spends the majority of her time acting as a chaperone for Catherine and Henry, but things take a turn for the better when they all make their journey back to Northanger Abbey. Because of Catherine and Eleanor's friendship, and due to Henry's love interest, Catherine is invited to stay with them in Northanger Abbey, to which they use this opportunity to get to know each other better on a personal level. This is the point where Eleanor explains the reason for her mother's absence, to which we discover that Mrs. Tilney had died due to a serious illness, leaving Mr. Tilney with three children to raise by himself. Other than her friendship with Catherine and their time spent together in Northanger Abbey, Eleanor plays no other role throughout the novel, except for the fact that she persuades her father to grant Catherine and Henry permission to marry.

Frederick Tilney: He is the older brother of Henry Tilney and Eleanor Tilney, and the presumed heir to the Northanger estate. Frederick is an officer in the army, who takes advantage of women with his handsome and fashionable looks, pursuing flirtations with pretty girls who are willing to offer him some encouragement (though without any serious intent on his part). This is evident throughout his interactions with Isabella Thorpe as mentioned by Henry when describing his brother's personality to Catherine when he states that "Frederick is a lively, and perhaps sometimes a thoughtless young man; he [Frederick] has had about a week’s acquaintance with your friend [Isabella], and he has known her engagement almost as long as he has known her," (19.26). However, Frederick takes his interactions with Isabella a step further, and manages to sabotage her engagement with Catherine's brother James Morland. Known as "The Captain", Frederick represents Society's dual standards for behavior for men and women both. He also adds to the mystique of the Tilney family: Like father, Like son. Frederick's actions make Henry and Eleanor more sympathetic characters and his ruining of Isabella does the same for her character. Essentially, many readers perceive Frederick as nothing but selfish, greedy, and conniving.

Mr. Allen: Although his role is minimal in the story, he is a gruff but kind man, who is tolerant of Mrs. Allen's dim-witted behavior. He allows Catherine and his wife to accompany him in Bath, where he is being treated for gout. He often takes on a paternal role, serving as a guardian figure to Catherine, especially when he takes an interest in her love affair with Henry Tilney, being noted as "taken pains to know who her partner was", after their first meeting. Mr. Allen approves of the pair, as Tilney's reputation impresses him.

Mrs. Allen: A very dim-witted, childless woman, Mrs. Allen is a neighbor of the Morlands who invites Catherine to accompany her and her husband to Bath for a holiday. She thinks about nothing but clothing and how much it costs, and remembers very little from most conversations, merely repeating things that those around her say back to them. Supposed to serve as a guardian to Catherine during the trip to Bath, Mrs. Allen is too incapable of independent thought to properly guide Catherine through social situations. She runs into Mrs. Thorpe, a woman she knew fifteen years before at boarding school, which leads to her and Catherine spending much of their time in Bath with the Thorpes.

Composition
According to notes written by Austen's sister Cassandra after Jane's death in 1817, the novel was finished by 1798 or 1799. The close resemblance in style to Austen's "juvenilia" of the early 1790s together with several in-jokes that only the Austen family could have appreciated strongly suggests that the book was begun during that period, probably about 1794. However, the references to several Gothic novels published after 1794 would indicate Austen did not finish the book until about 1798 or 1799 as Cassandra Austen remembered. The scholar Cecil Emden argued that differences between the Catherine portrayed in the Bath section of the novel vs. the Catherine at Northanger Abbey were due to Austen finishing the book at a different stage of her life than when she started.

Major themes

As in all of Austen's novels, the subjects of society, status, behavior, and morality are addressed. Northanger Abbey, however, being chronologically the first novel completed by Austen (though revised later in her life), and notably considered a "point of departure" from her other work as a result of the "boldness with which it flaunts its . . . deceptive air of simplicity with broad, bold humour".

Love, marriage and high society  
When Catherine enters Bath, she is rather unaware of the societal setting she will encounter. The text notes that her mother, also, knew little of high society, which explains why Austen pairs Catherine with the Allens, who are higher ranked in society than she, due to their wealth. Society greatly influences partner selection, especially in Northanger Abbey, as General Tilney, for example, disapproves of Henry and Catherine's love due to their disparity in wealth. General Tilney only accepts Henry and Catherine's marriage after Eleanor Tilney becomes engaged to a wealthy man. Further, Catherine distances herself from John Thorpe, though he is societally deemed a "good" match for her. Rather, Catherine bravely situates love and companionship as more worthy than standing and rank, unlike Isabella, who ends the novel with two broken engagements.

Life lived as in a Gothic novel 
Though Austen greatly encourages the reading of novels to her readers, Catherine must learn to separate life from fiction, and rein in her very active imagination. When Catherine accuses General Tilney of murdering or locking up his wife, she is humiliated when it is discovered to be untrue, as Henry chastises her, by saying: "'You had formed a surmise of such horror as I have hardly words to— Dear Miss Morland, consider the dreadful nature of the suspicions you have entertained. What have you been judging from?'" Upon this, Catherine is mortified, and distraught at the notion that Henry would think less of her for her wild assumptions. When reflecting, Catherine identifies that she must separate Gothic novels from her judgement of everyday life. This serves as a major progression in the novel, as it is a sign of Catherine's maturation and ability to appreciate novels without immediately applying them to her behaviour and thoughts.

Bildungsroman  
While Catherine controls her imagination, she simultaneously endures the reality of individuals not behaving in the manner they should. Most prominently, Catherine realizes she is not to rely upon others, such as Isabella, who are negatively influential on her, but to be single-minded and independent. Isabella, regardless of her engagement to James Morland, flirts with Frederick Tilney, breaks her engagement to James, is discarded by Frederick, and causes herself great shame. Catherine began to realize the wrongs of Isabella's influence when the Thorpes cause her to miss her appointment with Henry and Eleanor Tilney early on, but it is not until the shocking wrongdoing against her brother that Catherine entirely separates herself from their friendship, stating that she may never speak to Isabella again, and is not as upset as she thought she would be. As this scene takes place almost immediately after Catherine's lesson about Gothic novels, it is a clear sign of her increasing maturity.

The value of reading 
In one of Austen's narrator's boldest proclamations, the narrator of Northanger Abbey exclaims upon the significance of reading novels, writing: "I will not adopt that ungenerous and impolitic custom so common with novel-writers, of degrading by their contemptuous censure the very performances, to the number of which they are themselves adding—joining with their greatest enemies in bestowing the harshest epithets on such works, and scarcely ever permitting them to be read by their own heroine, who, if she accidentally take up a novel, is sure to turn over its insipid pages with disgust. Alas! If the heroine of one novel be not patronized by the heroine of another, from whom can she expect protection and regard? I cannot approve of it". In this famous moment, Austen's narrator acknowledges the hypocrisy in insulting those who read novels. It is also made clear in this text that those who are considered "good" and well-educated read novels, such as Henry and Eleanor Tilney. John Thorpe, for example, who does not read novels, is the cad of the text. Furthermore, there is a distinction made between Catherine's imagination and childishness that encourages her fantasy of a murderous General Tilney, rather than it being a direct fault of the novel genre.

The importance of time 
Various scholars such as the French historian Michel Foucault and the British Marxist E.P. Thompson have argued the 18th century become the "era of the clock" as availability of mass-produced clocks and watches allowed time to be measured more accurately, leading to an increased emphasis on doing things on time that not existed before, marking the beginning of "time discipline" as Thompson called it. In what is seen as example of the new era of "time discipline", Austen frequently used clocks as symbol of General Tilney's authority over Northanger Abbey. Throughout the novel, General Tilney is checking his watch, and is most insistent that servants and his own family observe the clocks to see if they are doing things on time. During her time in Bath, Catherine had easy-going attitude to time, having no strict schedule and planning nothing in advance.

It is only after Catherine meets Henry Tilney that the novel begins to speak of the importance of time, with Catherine having to check the clocks to see if she will be on time to meet him. However, after arriving at Northanger Abbey, Catherine discovers that General Tilney is constantly checking his watch and that everything at the abbey happens on a strict schedule, which is a marked difference from Catherine's lax attitude that she displayed in Bath. When Catherine is late to a dinner, General Tilney shows his displeasure by pacing back and forth in the dining room while frequently glancing at the clock. Because of the importance of staying on schedule, even when General Tilney is not around, clocks serve as a symbol of his power as Catherine finds herself checking what time it is all the time.

As the novel progresses, Catherine finds the discipline imposed by the clocks more and more oppressive, as she finds that she is living her life according to General Tilney's dictates and demands. Catherine compares General Tilney to a clock, as something inhuman and mechanical that operates with no regard to the human body. At one point, when Catherine receives a letter from her brother, she allows herself "half a hour’s free indulgence of grief and reflection" before composing herself for dinner all the while watching the clock. When Catherine visits the kitchen, she notes that it is equipped with all manner of "modern" cooking equipment and that the cooks worked in an efficient manner like soldiers performing a drill, which reflects the General's wish to have everything ordered. Likewise, General Tilney's ownership of a glasshouse that allows rare tropical fruit like pineapples to be grown in England was a sign that he was extremely rich as only those in the highest income brackets could afford a glasshouse, which was a symbol of luxury in Regency England.

Publication

Austen initially sold the novel, then titled Susan, for £10 to a London bookseller, Crosby & Co. in 1803. This publisher did not print the work but held on to the manuscript. Austen reportedly threatened to take her work back from them, but Crosby & Co responded that she would face legal consequences for reclaiming her text. In the spring of 1816, the bookseller sold it back to the novelist's brother, Henry Austen, for the same sum as they had paid for it. There is evidence that Austen further revised the novel in 1816–1817 with the intention of having it published. She rewrote sections, renaming the main character Catherine and using that as her working title.

After her death, Austen's brother Henry gave the novel its final name and arranged for publication of Northanger Abbey in late December 1817 (1818 given on the title page), as the first two volumes of a four-volume set, with a preface for the first time publicly identifying Jane Austen as the author of all her novels. Neither Northanger Abbey nor Persuasion was published under the working title Jane Austen used. Aside from first being published together, the two novels are not connected; later editions were published separately.

Reputation 

Northanger Abbey and Persuasion, published together posthumously in December 1817, were reviewed in the British Critic in March 1818 and in the Edinburgh Review and Literary Miscellany in May 1818. The reviewer for the British Critic felt that Austen's exclusive dependence on realism was evidence of a deficient imagination. The reviewer for the Edinburgh Review disagreed, praising Austen for her "exhaustless invention" and the combination of the familiar and the surprising in her plots. 

Austen scholars have pointed out that these early reviewers did not know what to make of her novels—for example, they misunderstood her use of irony. Reviewers, for example, reduced Sense and Sensibility and Pride and Prejudice to didactic tales of virtue prevailing over vice.

Satire

Gothic novel, etc. 
Northanger Abbey is fundamentally a parody of Gothic fiction, which was especially popular during the 1790s and at the turn of the nineteenth century. Austen upends the conventions of eighteenth-century novels by making her heroine a plain and undistinguished girl from a middle-class family, allowing the heroine to fall in love with the hero before he has a serious thought of her, and exposing the heroine's romantic fears and curiosities as groundless. However, the British critic Robert Irvine wrote that though Catherine's specific fears that General Tilney murdered his wife are false, the book ends with her general fears of him being confirmed as his character is indeed vicious as the book says: "Catherine, at any rate, heard enough to feel, that in suspecting General Tilney of either murdering or shutting up his wife, she had scarcely sinned against his character, or magnified his cruelty". Likewise, the scholar Rachel Brownstein observed that Catherine's fears of General Tilney are in substance correct, though the book notes he turns out be a "villain of common life", not that of romance. Brownstein wrote that the conclusion the book invites is: "...our heroine's instincts were good guides to truth—perhaps even that they were good because they were informed by Gothic novels about vulnerable women persecuted by powerful men".

Irvine also points out that though parts of the book do satirize the Gothic novels popular in the 18th century, the interpretation of the novel as completely a satire of the Gothic genre is problematic. Irvine points out that, except in book II, the problems faced by Catherine are not caused by her reading Gothic novels, nor is Catherine's rejection of romantic love following Henry's outburst the climax, but instead is followed by Catherine being summarily expelled from Northanger Abbey after General Tilney discovers that she is not rich as he had been led to believe. Irvine observed that for Catherine her expulsion is a traumatic event that is equal in its emotional impact to the horrors that she had imagined General Tilney committing. Irvine also notes that the first chapters in the novel satirize the novels of Maria Edgeworth and Frances Burney, whom the novel ostensibly praises, as it does the Gothic novels. An early sign that Henry Tilney is the hero while John Thorpe is not can be seen in the fact that the former likes to read books while the latter does not.

Austen was also influenced by The Female Quixote; or, The Adventures of Arabella (1752) a novel by Charlotte Lennox that was an imitation and parody of Miguel de Cervantes' Don Quixote. It was approved by both Henry Fielding and Samuel Richardson, and applauded by Samuel Johnson. 

The story begins with the narrator remarking that the heroine is not really a heroine, with the narrator saying Catherine was not especially clever, nor a great beauty, and good without being virtuous. The narrator goes to say the reader was expecting the heroine to be very virtuous, clever, and striking beautiful, which makes Catherine a "strange, unaccountable character!" Only with the second chapter does the narrator have anything positive to say about Catherine, which are even then still qualified by attaching the adjectives "remarkable" and extraordinary", which is only meant ironically as what the narrator calls the "extraordinary" traits of Catherine are in fact quite ordinary, which seems to be Austen's way of satirizing how women were portrayed in contemporary literature. Austen's point appears to be what there is a gulf between how women really are and how they are portrayed in novels. The point is further emphasized by satirizing Richardson's rule laid out in The Rambler "that no young lady can be justified in falling in love before the gentleman’s love is declared", which Catherine breaks without suffering. Later, when Catherine is feeling depressed, her mother tries unsuccessfully to cheer her up by having her read The Mirror (a popular journal in the late 18th century), which seems to be Austen's way of saying that what the moralising journals have to say is not applicable in real life.

A reviewer in 2016 said "Austen’s Northanger Abbey was in part a playful response to what she considered "unnatural" in the novels of her day: Instead of perfect heroes, heroines and villains, she offers flawed, rounded characters who behave naturally and not just according to the demands of the plot."

Masculine power: Johnson, Richardson, Blair and Addison 

At one point when Catherine uses the word "nice" in a way that Henry disapproves of, she is warned: "The word 'nicest', as you use it, did not suit him; and you had better change it as soon as you can, or you shall be overpowered with Johnson and Blair all the rest of the way". The popular 18th-century arbiters of style and taste such as Johnson, Richardson, Blair and Addison are presented as a canon of masculine power, which the novel is competition with at least as much as the Gothic novels, that were so popular with young women at the time. Irvine wrote that the way in which Henry frequently quotes these authors show he is just as much trapped in the world of the essays laying out rules of conduct and style as Catherine is influenced by the Gothic novels she loves to read. When Henry tries to dissuade Catherine of her Gothic-inspired notions that General Tilney is a murderer, he cites the (male) authors of the essays that were so influential in establishing rules of proper conduct, in short, is trying to dismiss one genre that was popular with women, with another genre that was popular with men. Irvine wrote that: "The fact that the Gothic (and perhaps the novel in general) provides a means whereby young women can think for themselves is perhaps the real threat that Henry is countering here. After all, as we have seen, Catherine’s fantasy proves to be a way of imagining as evil a truth about the General that Henry never criticises: the absolute nature of patriarchal power. The type of language that Henry uses does not originate with him: it is borrowed from the essays of Johnson, Blair and company, and gets its authority, its power over Catherine, from that masculine source". Irvine contended that the discourse of the essays was a "linguistic version of the patriarchal power of the General", as a way of imposing power over women, not by locking them up in a room, but imposing a type of language that limits what one may think or not. In this sense, Henry speaks either with his "natural tone" when he is being himself and his "affected" tone, where he uses the discourse of a Johnsonian essay, which mirrors the description at the beginning of the book between the narrator's ideal heroine and Catherine.

However, even when Henry is speaking with his natural tone, his speech is that expected of a polite society in Britain at the time. The ingenue Catherine, who has just arrived in Bath, is unfamiliar with the ways of a polite society, and is vaguely aware that Henry's "affected" tone is meant to be satirical, but is uncertain about what is the joke here. As a Bildungsroman, Catherine has to learn the ways of polite society in order to fit in. Of her possible guides, Mrs. Allen is too dim to provide the necessary knowledge while John Thorpe, though from the gentry, is only interested in gambling and horses. With Thorpe, Austen makes the point that mere ownership of land does not make for a gentleman, as Thorpe is simply too vulgar to be a gentleman despite being of the gentry, which is further emphasised in that when he pays Catherine a compliment, she says it "gives me no pleasure" to receive a compliment from someone like him. Isabella Thorpe initially appears as Catherine's friend, but she proves herself an unworthy friend when she mentions to Catherine's brother James, much to the latter's mortification, that she is too fond of both the Tilneys. The way in which Isabella embarrasses Catherine is a violation of the major unwritten rules of polite society, namely the reciprocity principle that one should always think of the feelings of others. By contrast, Eleanor just conducts herself as a friend, albeit one who speaks in the same sort of language her brother mocks. Henry establishes himself as worthy of being Catherine's husband in his role as a "lover mentor" who teaches Catherine the ways of polite society to allow her to eventually fit in.

As part of the novel's satire of the literature of the day, the American scholar Rachel Brownstein noted that Henry Tilney is described as "not quite handsome though very near it", it is implied to be not quite entirely manly owing to his love of literature and fabrics, and is explicitly shown to be dominated by his father. It is General Tilney rather than his son who openly admires the attractions of Catherine's body, praising her for the "elasticity of her walking, which in turn causing her to with great elasticity, though she had never thought of it before". However, Brownstein wrote that Henry is the hero of the book as he constantly ridicules cliché language, is able to understand the type of books read by women because he also reads them, and is able to rise above the crowd as notes the lazy language used by others who overuse words like "amazingly" and "nice". Another trope of the fiction of the day is satirized when Catherine first meets Henry at a dance and likes him right away, which in its turn causes him to pay attention to her for the first time. Most notably, it is the Thorpes who have to restrain Catherine from following Henry after the dance by holding her arms, which was not the sort of behavior that was expected of heroines in romantic novels at the time.

Family entertainment 

According to Austen biographer Claire Tomalin "there is very little trace of personal allusion in the book, although it is written more in the style of a family entertainment than any of the others". Joan Aiken writes: "We can guess that Susan [the original title of Northanger Abbey], in its first outline, was written very much for family entertainment, addressed to a family audience, like all Jane Austen’s juvenile works, with their asides to the reader, and absurd dedications; some of the juvenilia, we know, were specifically addressed to her brothers Charles and Frank; all were designed to be circulated and read by a large network of relations."

Allusions to other works

Several Gothic novels and authors are mentioned in the book, including Fanny Burney and The Monk. Isabella Thorpe gives Catherine a list of seven books that are commonly referred to as the "Northanger 'horrid' novels". These works were later thought to be of Austen's own invention until the British writers Montague Summers and Michael Sadleir re-discovered in the 1920s that the novels actually did exist. The list is as follows:
 Castle of Wolfenbach (1793) by Eliza Parsons. London: Minerva Press.
 Clermont (1798) by Regina Maria Roche. London: Minerva Press.
 The Mysterious Warning, a German Tale (1796) by Eliza Parsons. London: Minerva Press.
 The Necromancer; or, The Tale of the Black Forest (1794) by "Lawrence Flammenberg" (pseudonym for Karl Friedrich Kahlert; translated by "Peter Teuthold," pseudonym for Peter Will). London: Minerva Press.
 The Midnight Bell (1798) by Francis Lathom. London: H. D. Symonds.
 The Orphan of the Rhine (1798) by Eleanor Sleath. London: Minerva Press. Tenille Nowak has noted that critics and editors of Northanger Abbey often suggest that the names Laurentina and St Aubin appearing in the text are misrememberings of character names from Udolpho; Nowak observes that due to there being very few copies of The Orphan of the Rhine available these critics did not realise that the names actually appear in their exact form in Sleath's novel. Nowak observes other instances where Sleath's novel is echoed by Austen, particularly in her descriptions of place.
 Horrid Mysteries (1796), which is an abridged translation by Peter Will of Carl Grosse's The Genius. London: Minerva Press. (Marquis de Grosse's The Genius or the Mysterious Adventures of Don Carlos de Grandez was later translated by Joseph Trapp in 2 volumes. London: Allen and West, No. 15 Paternoster Row.)

All seven of these were republished by the Folio Society in London in the 1960s, and since 2005 Valancourt Books has released new editions of the "horrids", the seventh and final being released in 2015.

The Mysteries of Udolpho 
The most significant allusion, however, is to Ann Radcliffe's The Mysteries of Udolpho, as it is the Gothic novel most frequently mentioned within this text. Notably, Jane Austen sold the manuscript of Northanger Abbey to the same firm that published Radcliffe's novel in 1794.

This outside text is first mentioned in Chapter Six, when Isabella and Catherine discuss the mystery "behind the black veil", and further establish their friendship based on their similar interests in novel genre, and their plans to continue reading other Gothic novels together. Austen further satirizes the novel through Catherine's stay at Northanger Abbey, believing that General Tilney has taken the role of Gothic novel villain.

Austen's discussion of Udolpho is also used to clearly separate Catherine from John Thorpe, as when Catherine talks about the novel with him, he crudely responds that he "never reads novels", but qualifies his statement by arguing he would only read a novel by Ann Radcliffe, who, as Catherine then points out, is the author of Udolpho. Here, Austen humorously categorizes Northanger Abbey’s characters into two spheres: those who read novels, and those who do not. When Catherine and Henry Tilney later discuss reading novels, and Henry earnestly responds that he enjoys reading novels, and was especially titillated by Udolpho, the match between Catherine and Henry is implied as both smart and fitting.

Allusions to Northanger Abbey

A passage from the novel appears as the preface of Ian McEwan's Atonement, thus likening the naive mistakes of Austen's Catherine Morland to those of his own character Briony Tallis, who is in a similar position: both characters have very over-active imaginations, which lead to misconceptions that cause distress in the lives of people around them. Both treat their own lives like those of heroines in fantastical works of fiction, with Miss Morland likening herself to a character in a Gothic novel and young Briony Tallis writing her own melodramatic stories and plays with central characters such as "spontaneous Arabella" based on herself.

Richard Adams quotes a portion of the novel's last sentence for the epigraph to Chapter 50 in his Watership Down; the reference to the General is felicitous, as the villain in Watership Down is also a General.

Jasper Fforde, in his alternate history comic fantasy novel First Among Sequels, refers to Northanger Abbey as being under maintenance, and "should be ready on time as long as Catherine stops attempting to have the book 'Gothicized'." It appears again as the prize in a reality program, based on the lives of the Bennets from Pride and Prejudice.

Reference to baseball 
The book, also, contains an early historical reference to baseball. It is found in the first chapter of the novel, describing the interest of the heroine : "Catherine, who had by nature nothing heroic about her, should prefer cricket, baseball, riding on horseback, and running about the country". It is not the earliest known reference to the term, which is a 1744 British publication, A Little Pretty Pocket-Book, by John Newbery, as described in Origins of baseball. The modern game is not described, but the term is used.

Adaptations

Film, TV or theatrical adaptations
Spanish television TVE loosely adapted the story as La abadía de Northanger in 1968. It starred Lola Herrera as Catalina (Catherine) Morland, Alicia Hermida as Isabela Thorpe, and Pepe Martín as Henry Tilney.
The A&E Network and the BBC released the television adaptation Northanger Abbey in 1987.
An adaptation of Northanger Abbey with screenplay by Andrew Davies, was shown on ITV on 25 March 2007 as part of their "Jane Austen Season". This adaptation aired on PBS in the United States as part of the "Complete Jane Austen" on Masterpiece Classic in January 2008. It stars Felicity Jones as Catherine Morland and JJ Feild as Henry Tilney.
A stage adaptation of Northanger Abbey by Tim Luscombe (published by Nick Hern Books ), was produced by Salisbury Playhouse in 2009. It was revived in Chicago in 2013 at the Remy Bumppo Theatre.
A theatrical adaptation by Michael Napier Brown was performed at the Royal Theatre in Northampton in 1998.
The 1993 independent film Ruby in Paradise starring Ashley Judd was loosely inspired by Northanger Abbey. 
 "Pup Fiction" – an episode of Wishbone featuring the plot and characters of Austen's Northanger Abbey.

Radio
 In 2016, BBC Radio 4 broadcast an adaptation by Hattie Naylor with Georgia Groome as Catherine. An adaptation of The Mysteries of Udolpho was broadcast at the same time, also adapted by Naylor, with the same cast.

Audio drama 

In July 2017, Audible released an original dramatisation of Northanger Abbey featuring Emma Thompson, Douglas Booth, Eleanor Tomlinson, Ella Purnell, Jeremy Irvine and Lily Cole.

Web series 

 In 2015, the modern web series adaptation Northbound, by Anya Steiner, was released on YouTube.
 In 2016, the modern web series adaptation The Cate Morland Chronicles was released on YouTube.

Literature
HarperCollins hired Scottish crime writer Val McDermid in 2012 to adapt Northanger Abbey for a modern audience, as a suspenseful teen thriller, the second rewrite in The Austen Project. McDermid said of the project, "At its heart it’s a teen novel, and a satire – that’s something which fits really well with contemporary fiction. And you can really feel a shiver of fear moving through it. I will be keeping the suspense – I know how to keep the reader on the edge of their seat. I think Jane Austen builds suspense well in a couple of places, but she squanders it, and she gets to the endgame too quickly. So I will be working on those things." The novel was published in 2014.

In 2011, Marvel published a graphic novel version of Northanger Abbey, adapted by Nancy Butler (writer), Janet K. Lee (artist) and Nick Filardi (color artist). The book, originally is the last of the Jane Austen adaptations made by Marvel, and contrarily to the other books of the series, is the only one to be released only in paperback, not in hardback.

The same year, author Jenni James published a modern teen version entitled Northanger Alibi, published by Inkpress, in which the main character's obsession for Stephenie Meyer's Twilight saga replaces Catherine's love for Regency gothic novels.

Newbury Acres: An Amish Retelling of Northanger Abbey (2017) by Sarah Price.

See also

References

External links

 
 
 

 
1817 British novels
British bildungsromans
Fictional houses
Novels by Jane Austen
Parodies of literature
Novels published posthumously
Novels set in Somerset
British novels adapted into television shows
British novels adapted into films
Fictional buildings and structures originating in literature